Williams Joseph Gabriel Kokolo (born 9 June 2000) is a French professional footballer who plays for Burton Albion as a left back. He also plays on the left wing.

Club career

Sunderland
Kokolo signed for Sunderland in July 2017, having left Monaco at the age of 16.

On 6 December 2018, Kokolo signed for National League North side Darlington on a "work experience loan". He made his professional debut two days later, starting and playing the full match in a 2–1 loss to Nuneaton Borough. During his tenure, Kokolo made 3 starts and 6 substitute appearances for the Quakers.

Middlesbrough
On 11 March 2020, Kokolo signed a two-year contract with local rivals Middlesbrough of the Championship, signing for the Teesside-based club on a free transfer.

Burton Albion
On 11 January 2022, Kokolo signed for EFL League One side Burton Albion. He scored his first goal on 12 February 2022 in a 2-2 draw against Cambridge United

Personal life
Born in France, Kokolo is of Congolese descent.

In August 2022, Kokolo was charged with three counts of rape.  Kokolo has yet to enter a formal plea to the charges and has been granted unconditional bail.

References

2000 births
Living people
French footballers
French sportspeople of Democratic Republic of the Congo descent
AS Monaco FC players
Sunderland A.F.C. players
Darlington F.C. players
Middlesbrough F.C. players
Burton Albion F.C. players
Association football defenders
Association football wingers
Black French sportspeople